The 2015–16 season was Al-Minaa's 40th season in the Iraqi Premier League, having featured in all 42 editions of the competition except two.

Squad

Players Data

Transfers

In

Out
{| class="wikitable"
|-
! Date
! Pos.
! Name
! To
! Fee
|-
| July 2015
| MF
|  Júnior
| End of contract
| –
|-
| July 2015
| FW
|  Gleisson
| End of contract
| –
|-
| July 2015
| MF
|  Omar Alaa Ahmed
| End of contract
| –
|-
| July 2015
| DF
|  Ali Jassim
| End of contract
| –
|-
| July 2015
| FW
|  Hussein Ali Wahed
|  Al-Shorta
| Undisclosed
|-
| July 2015
| MF
|  Hussein Abdul Wahed
|  Al-Shorta
| Undisclosed
|-
| July 2015
| DF
|  Mohammed Abdul Karim
|  Naft Al-Janoob
| Undisclosed
|-
| August 2015
| GK
|  Amjad Rahim
|  Al-Shorta
| Undisclosed
|-
| September 2015
| MF
|  Hamid Mido
|  Al-Quwa Al-Jawiya
| Undisclosed
|-
| December 2015
| DF
|  Ali Hussein
| 
| Released
|-
| December 2015
| MF
|  Ghiyath Shokor
| 
| Released
|-
| December 2015
| FW
|  Omar Khribin
|  Al-Dhafra
| Undisclosed
|-

Technical staff

{| class="wikitable"
|-
! Position
! Name
|-
| Coach
|  Hussam Al Sayed
|-
|  Assistant coach
|  Ahmad Rahim
|-
| Fitness coach
|  Waleed Juma
|-
| Goalkeeping coach
|  Aqeel Abdul Mohsin
|-
| Club doctor
|  Faris Abdullah
|-
| Doctor's assistant
|  Fuad Mahdi

Board members

Kit

Stadium
During the previous season, the stadium of Al-Mina'a demolished. A company will build a new stadium that will be completed in 2016. Since they can't play their games at Al Mina'a Stadium, they will be playing at Basra Sports City during this season.

Friendlies

Iraqi Premier League

Group stage : Group – 2

Summary table

Results by matchday

Matches

 Away matches

 Home matches

Final stage

Results by matchday

Matches

Iraq FA Cup

Squad statistics

Top scorers

Sources
 FIFA.COM 
 Iraqi League 2015/2016
 Al-Minaa SC: Transfers and News

Al-Mina'a SC seasons
Al Mina